Mikhail Aleksandrovich Kanaev (born 1 October 1989) is a Russian professional football player. He plays for FC Dynamo Vologda

Club career
He made his Russian Football National League debut for FC Khimki on 28 March 2010 in a game against FC Salyut Belgorod.

External links
 

1989 births
People from Komsomolsk-on-Amur
Sportspeople from Khabarovsk Krai
Living people
Russian footballers
Association football midfielders
FC Saturn Ramenskoye players
FC Khimki players
FC Vityaz Podolsk players
FC Orenburg players
FC Tyumen players
FC Zenit-Izhevsk players
FC Torpedo Moscow players
FC Volga Ulyanovsk players
FC Neftekhimik Nizhnekamsk players
FC Shinnik Yaroslavl players
FC Dynamo Vologda players
Russian First League players
Russian Second League players